Thom Beers (born July 20, 1952 in Batavia, New York) is an American television producer and narrator/voice-over artist.

Career
Beers, a former producer and executive with Turner Broadcasting and Paramount Syndicated Television, has produced more than 40 television series since the mid-1990s, most under the banner of his own production company formed in 1999, Original Productions, for which he serves as CEO and Executive Producer. Beers produces some of the shows on the Discovery Channel family of networks, including Deadliest Catch (for which he received Emmy nominations in 2006 and 2007), Lobster Wars, Monster Garage, Monster House, and Plastic Surgery: Before and After. He is the former chairman & CEO of FremantleMedia's US division, FremantleMedia North America.

Beers narrates for many of the shows he produces.  He narrated for several Discovery Channel series like Swords: Life on the Line, and Verminators; in addition to narrating most of Original Productions' shows (Beers narrated the pilot for Deadliest Catch but turned over series narration duties to fellow Discovery Channel personality Mike Rowe after the series was picked up), he can be heard narrating many shows on Discovery Health Channel, including Impact: Stories of Survival. In 2007, he produced and narrated Ice Road Truckers for the History Channel and narrated Ax Men in 2008 about logging. Like Deadliest Catch, both shows had their roots in a special about a dangerous occupation. In 2010 he was also the executive producer and narrator of Storage Wars on A&E.

Most recently, truTV has enlisted Beers and Original Productions for their own "dangerous occupation" series: Black Gold, a documentary about oil drillers. Beers is also executive producer and narrator for Tornado Road, a mini-series on The Weather Channel and Whisker Wars which airs on IFC.

Also, he narrates for the show America's Port, narrates and is an executive producer for Wild Justice both on the National Geographic Channel, the pilot episodes of 1,000 Ways to Die on Spike, Pitchmen, and The Colony on the Discovery Channel. Beers was also the supervising producer for the cartoon Captain Planet and the Planeteers on TBS from 1990-1991 for 26 episodes.

References

External links
 
 Original Productions bio for Thom Beers

Living people
American television producers
American male voice actors
American reality television producers
1952 births
People from Batavia, New York